Liu Pui Fung (born 21 August 1991 in Hong Kong) is a former Hong Kong professional football player and currently amateur player for Hong Kong Third Division club King Mountain.

Club career
In 2008, Liu joined Hong Kong Third Division club Wong Tai Sin.

On 28 November 2015, Liu scored his first goal in 2015–16 Hong Kong Premier League against Pegasus, which ended 2-2.

On 31 January 2018, Dreams FC announced that they had acquired Liu from Rangers (HKG).

On 2 July 2018, Liu left Dreams FC for Pegasus on a free transfer. After appearing in seven matches for Pegasus, Liu announced his retirement on 8 December in order to transition into a career with the Disciplined Services.

References

External links
 Liu Pui Fung at HKFA
 

1991 births
Living people
Hong Kong footballers
Hong Kong Rangers FC players
Dreams Sports Club players
TSW Pegasus FC players
Association football wingers